Robert Carmona (born 30 April 1962) is a Uruguayan footballer who plays as a centre-back and captains fourth-division club Hacele Un Gol a la Vida. Besides Uruguay, he has played in the lower leagues of Canada, United States, Spain, and Italy for 30 teams in total and 2,200 official matches.

Career 

Carmona started his career in 1976 as a playmaker and holds the Guinness World Record for the longest football career, playing without a season break ever since. He also holds the record for the player with the biggest gap between spells at a club, featuring for La Luz F.C. in 1984-85, before returning in 2009 (24 years). Despite having undergone eight operations due to injuries, his intention is to continue playing football.

See also 
 List of world association football records 
 List of men's footballers with the most official appearances

References 

Association football defenders
Expatriate footballers in Italy
Expatriate footballers in Spain
Expatriate soccer players in Canada
Expatriate soccer players in the United States
Living people
Uruguayan expatriate footballers
Uruguayan expatriate sportspeople in Canada
Uruguayan expatriate sportspeople in Italy
Uruguayan expatriate sportspeople in Spain
Uruguayan expatriate sportspeople in the United States
Uruguayan footballers
1962 births